The 1997–98 Idaho Vandals men's basketball team represented the University of Idaho during the 1997–98 NCAA Division I men's basketball season. Members of the Big West Conference, the Vandals were led by first-year head coach David Farrar and played their home games on campus at the Kibbie Dome in Moscow, Idaho.

They met West division champion Pacific in the first round of the conference tournament and lost by

Postseason result

|-
!colspan=6 style=| Big West tournament

References

External links
Sports Reference – Idaho Vandals: 1997–98 basketball season
Gem of the Mountains: 1998 University of Idaho yearbook – 1997–98 basketball season
Idaho Argonaut – student newspaper – 1998 editions

Idaho Vandals men's basketball seasons
Idaho
1998 in sports in Idaho
Idaho